The Symington family may refer to

 Symington family (United States), a family of American politicians
 Symington Family Estates, a family of British port wine makers